Damariscotta Lake State Park is a public recreation area located in the town of Jefferson, Lincoln County Maine. The park occupies  at the northeast corner of  Damariscotta Lake. It is managed by the Maine Department of Agriculture, Conservation and Forestry.

History
The park was created in 1970 and had 25,000 visitors in 2010. The park's original group shelter, which dated from 1976, was destroyed by arson in 2009. A replacement shelter was dedicated in 2011.

Activities and amenities
The park features sandy beach, swimming, canoeing, picnicking facilities, and fishing.

References

External links
Damariscotta Lake State Park Department of Agriculture, Conservation and Forestry

State parks of Maine
Protected areas of Lincoln County, Maine
Protected areas established in 1970
1970 establishments in Maine